Bidaa Bint Saud is an archaeological site in Al-Ain Region, Abu Dhabi, United Arab Emirates, notable for its Hafit Period tombs, Iron Age irrigation systems and rare remains of an Iron Age building thought to have been a distribution centre for water from two aflaj (systems of underground and surface waterways). It is a listed UN World Heritage Site. Finds from the site are displayed at Al Ain National Museum.

The dating of pottery from the aflaj (singular falaj) waterways found at the site demonstrates a south-eastern Arabian origin for this distinctive system of irrigation, previously thought by many scholars to have been Persian in origin. The dating of aflaj in Bidaa bint Saud, Al Ain and Buraimi, both of which are in the historical region of Tawam, has been placed several centuries prior to the Achaemenid Empire, which had previously been credited with the innovation.

Bronze Age tombs 

A number of distinctive Hafit Period (3200 to 2600 BCE) tombs litter the eastern face of Garn bint Saud, similar to those found at sites such as Jebel Hafit, Jebel Buhais and Buraimi. These have collapsed and would originally have had domed roofs. It is likely the location of the Hafit remains, the Hafit people being nomadic and pastoral, is because of a source of groundwater, a pattern supported by other Hafit era inland finds, including those at Jebel Hafit and Jebel Buhais.

Iron Age waterways 

A second set of collective graves found at the site dated from the Iron Age and were also built of uncut or rough-cut stone and formed into a variety of shapes. These were divided into several chambers, each of which contained the remains of several people. Despite having been plundered in the past, excavations from these Iron Age tombs yielded a number of artefacts, including pottery and stone vessels, dagger blades, bronze arrowheads, and beads. 

It is thought Bidaa Bint Saud became an important site during the Iron Age, both as a caravan stop and as a settled community of farmers that used the falaj irrigation system. 

Two of these irrigation passages have been partly excavated at Bidaa bin Saud, with a number of sections remaining in reasonable condition. In one of the excavations, a number of sandstone-lined shaft holes were discovered, as well as a stepped underground access point and a large open cistern. Evidence of formerly irrigated land has also been found at the site.

Storage rooms were a later addition and contained finds of many storage jars. While the building's precise purpose remains unclear, archaeologists think it was likely a distribution point for the water from the falaj systems and it has been dubbed Bait Al-Falaj.

See also 
 Iron Age in the United Arab Emirates
Al Ain Oasis
 List of Ancient Settlements in the UAE
 List of cultural property of national significance in the United Arab Emirates
 Qattara Oasis
 Rumailah, UAE
 Umm Al Nar culture

References 

Archaeological sites in the United Arab Emirates
Buildings and structures in the Emirate of Abu Dhabi
Eastern Region, Abu Dhabi